George D. Bryan (1845–1919) was the forty-seventh mayor of Charleston, South Carolina, completing one term from 1887 to 1891. Bryan was born on September 26, 1845, in Charleston to United States judge George S. and Rebecca Louisa Dwight. He died on June 4, 1919, and is buried at Magnolia Cemetery in Charleston.

He was a student at the United States Naval Academy when the Civil War erupted, and he left the school to join the Confederate Navy. After the Civil War, he returned to Charleston and practiced law. In May 1878 he became the city's legal counsel. He was elected mayor on December 13, 1887, in an uncontested race. After his one term as mayor, in 1894, President Grover Cleveland appointed him to be collector of customs in Charleston, a job he held until July 1898. He was a probate judge from December 1901 to his death on June 4, 1919.

References

Mayors of Charleston, South Carolina
1845 births
1919 deaths
19th-century American politicians